Berlinette may refer to:

 The Berlinette style of automobile body.
 The Alpine A110, a sports car produced by the French manufacturer Alpine from 1961 to 1977, often simply called the Berlinette
 Three models of car made by Hommell, a French automobile manufacturer
 The Berlinette (album), by German experimental techno producer Ellen Allien